A Different Hat is the thirteenth solo studio album by the English singer-songwriter Paul Carrack. Recorded with The Royal Philharmonic Orchestra, it is a collection mostly of cover songs, ranging from the Frank Sinatra standard "All the Way" to the Bonnie Raitt ballad "I Can't Make You Love Me".  Carrack also tackled four of his own songs which he had previously recorded, heard here in new arrangements: "I Live On a Battlefield" (previously recorded as "Battlefield" on 1989's Groove Approved), "Eyes of Blue", "Love Will Keep Us Alive" and "It Ain't Over".

A Different Hat was originally released in 2010 on Carrack's own Carrack-UK label.

Track listing

Personnel
Musicians
 Paul Carrack – vocals, grand piano
 The Royal Philharmonic Orchestra – orchestra 
 David Cullen – orchestral arrangements and conductor
 Gill Townend – music preparation 
 Davy Spillane – low whistle

Production
 Peter Van Hooke – producer
 Paul Carrack – producer
 Geoff Foster – engineer 
 Simon Rhodes – engineer
 Graham Bonnett – additional engineer
 Rupert Cobb – additional engineer, Pro Tools
 Mick Glossop – mixing
 Ian Ross – design 
 Andrea Hunnisett – photography

References

External links

2010 albums
Paul Carrack albums
Royal Philharmonic Orchestra albums